Shoe Island may refer to: 

In Canada:
Shoe Island (Nunavut) an island in Nunavut

In New Zealand:
 Shoe Island (Waikato) an island in Waikato 
 a small island of the Auckland Islands

In the Philippines:
 Shoe Lake (Philippines)

In the United States
Shoe Island (Lake Michigan), an island in Lake Michigan in the U.S. state of Michigan